Antony Nicholas Allott (30 June 1924 – 3 June 2002) was an English academic, Professor of African Law at the University of London.

He was educated at Downside School and New College, Oxford. He was appointed lecturer in African law at SOAS in 1948, and was Professor in African Law at the University of London from 1964 to 1986.
He was director of Japanese company 'University Consultants' from 1990.

Works
Essays in African law, with special reference to the law of Ghana, 1960
Judicial and legal systems in Africa, 1962
The limits of law, 1980

References

1924 births
2002 deaths
Alumni of New College, Oxford
English legal scholars
English Africanists
People educated at Downside School
English Roman Catholics
Academics of the University of London
Presidents of the African Studies Association of the United Kingdom